The Honourable Stephen Pendrill Charles  is a retired Australian judge who served on the Supreme Court of Victoria Court of Appeal between 1995 and 2006.

In 2017 Charles was appointed an Officer of the Order of Australia for distinguished service to the law and to the judiciary, particularly in the areas of commercial arbitration and mediation, to judicial administration, and to legal professional organisations.

With Catherine Williams, he co-wrote Keeping Them Honest, published in 2022 by Scribe.

References

Judges of the Supreme Court of Victoria
Living people
Year of birth missing (living people)
Officers of the Order of Australia